Happiness Costs Nothing is a 2003 Italian-French  drama film directed by Mimmo Calopresti.

Cast 

Mimmo Calopresti: Sergio
Vincent Pérez: Francesco
Valeria Bruni Tedeschi: Carla
Francesca Neri: Sara
Fabrizia Sacchi: Claudia
Luisa De Santis: Lucia
Peppe Servillo: Gianni
Valeria Solarino: Alessia 
Laura Betti: Nun

References

External links

2003 films
Italian drama films
2003 drama films
Films directed by Mimmo Calopresti
French drama films
2000s Italian-language films
2000s French films
2000s Italian films